Asprocottus korjakovi is a species of ray-finned fish belonging to the family Cottidae, the typical sculpins. This species is endemic to the ancient lake Baikal in Siberia. It is a member of the deepwater sculpin family Abyssocottidae, and was described scientifically by Valentina Sideleva in 2001.

References

korjakovi
Fish described in 2001